Jose Botello (born April 24, 1976 in Los Angeles, California) is a retired American soccer player. He is currently the head coach of the Hollywood United Hitmen in the USL Premier Development League.

Career

College
Botello played college soccer at East Los Angeles College and at California State University, Los Angeles.

Professional
Botello signed a Project-40 contract with Major League Soccer in 1997, and was assigned to the Los Angeles Galaxy. He played in 10 MLS games for Galaxy in his three years with the team, but never truly established himself as a regular starter, and was waived at the end of the 1999 season.  After being released by Galaxy, Botello played for Orange County Waves in the old A-League, and for Inter Tijuana in Mexico, before retiring from top flight competitive soccer in the mid-2000s. He went on to play for the L.A. Blues team in various amateur leagues in the Los Angeles area, and won several local cups and leagues between 2005 and 2009.

Coaching
Botello worked a coach for Southern California youth soccer organization Legends FC, alongside fellow ex-Galaxy player Alex Bengard. He was hired as head coach of the Hollywood United Hitmen in the USL Premier Development League in 2010.

References

External links
 

Living people
1979 births
American soccer coaches
American soccer players
American expatriate soccer players
Association football forwards
LA Galaxy players
Orange County Blue Star players
Major League Soccer players
MLS Pro-40 players
A-League (1995–2004) players
Soccer players from California
USL League Two coaches